The Overflow is a bounded rural locality, cadastral parish and Sheep station, 100 kilometers south of Nyngan, New South Wales. It is located at 32°12′05″S 146°38′31″E on Gunningbar Creek near the junction with the Bogan River and is in Bogan Shire and Flinders County. The locality is 32 kilometers south of the town of Nymagee, and west of Tottenham, New South Wales.

The elevation of "The Overflow" is 168 meters above sea level.

History
The original inhabitants of the area were the Wiradjuri Australian aboriginal tribe. However, anthropologist Norman Tindale believed the area around "The Overflow" was traditional lands of the neighboring Wangaibon a tribe of the Ngiyambaa peoples, though this may have been due to an error in one of his source materials.

Thomas Mitchell explored the area around the Bogan River in 1835.

"The Overflow" entered the Australian cultural consciousness with the poem Clancy of the Overflow by Banjo Paterson, and to a less extent the poems The Man from Snowy River (poem), and the satirical Banjo, of the Overflow, as well as the Bulletin Debate, all published about 1888/89. Clancy of the Overflow painted a somewhat idyllic picture of rural life, and this idealised "The Overflow" has become somewhat symbolic of the central west of New South Wales.

See also

Clancy of the Overflow
 Clancy's reply
Bobadah

References

Central West (New South Wales)
Towns in New South Wales